Adriano Afonso Thiel Munoz (born 23 July 1978) is a Brazilian footballer who is most noted for his time in the Nordic countries.

Munoz played for Finnish clubs Atlantis, AC Allianssi and MyPa, before he played in Tippeligaen for Sandefjord and Tromsø, and in Allsvenskan for Örebro. He later played for Cruzeiro RS Porto Alegre for and PS Kemi.

Career statistics

References

1978 births
Living people
Brazilian footballers
Esporte Clube Cruzeiro players
Atlantis FC players
AC Allianssi players
Myllykosken Pallo −47 players
Tromsø IL players
Sandefjord Fotball players
Örebro SK players
TP-47 players
Veikkausliiga players
Ykkönen players
Kakkonen players
Eliteserien players
Allsvenskan players
Brazilian expatriate footballers
Expatriate footballers in Finland
Brazilian expatriate sportspeople in Finland
Expatriate footballers in Norway
Brazilian expatriate sportspeople in Norway
Expatriate footballers in Sweden
Brazilian expatriate sportspeople in Sweden
Association football midfielders